Jorge da Costa Ferreira (born 18 March 1966 in Benguela, Portuguese Angola) is a  Portuguese retired footballer who played as a central defender.

External links

1966 births
Living people
Portuguese sportspeople of Angolan descent
Portuguese footballers
Association football defenders
Primeira Liga players
Liga Portugal 2 players
Segunda Divisão players
F.C. Barreirense players
Vitória F.C. players
S.C. Braga players
S.C. Campomaiorense players
C.F. União players
Portugal youth international footballers
Portugal under-21 international footballers
Portugal international footballers
People from Benguela